Nemat Sadat is an Afghan-American journalist, novelist, human rights activist, and former professor of political science at the American University of Afghanistan. Known for his debut novel The Carpet Weaver and his campaigning for LGBTQIA+ rights, particularly in the context of societal and cultural Islamic attitudes towards homosexuality in the Muslim world. Sadat is one of the first Afghans to have openly come out as gay and to campaign for LGBTQIA+ rights, gender freedom, and sexual liberty in Afghanistan.

He has degrees from California State University, Fullerton, University of California, Irvine, Harvard Extension School, Columbia University, and Oxford University.

Activism
In 2012, having secured the position of assistant professor in political science at the American University of Afghanistan, Sadat returned to Kabul. During his employment at the university, he used social media to mobilize an underground movement to openly campaign for LGBTQIA+ rights in Afghanistan.

In July 2013, his public outreach came to the attention of the Afghan government, which alleged that his activities were undermining Islam in the country and deemed him a threat to national security. Sadat was fired from his position at AUAF and he left Afghanistan, settling in New York City.

In August 2013, Nemat Sadat publicly announced his sexuality, becoming the first Afghanistan native to come out as gay. According to Nemat, he received several death threats including a fatwa issued against him by the mullahs of Afghanistan due to this. In October of the same year, Sadat faced a second wave of widespread hostility in Afghan media. Commenting on his LGBT activism in an interview for The Guardian in November 2013, Sadat said, I am making a sacrifice, but I want Afghan youth to look at me and see that there are people who are Afghan and Muslim and gay. It will give them hope.

In June 2016, after the Orlando nightclub shooting, Nemat Sadat voiced his perspective as a U.S.-based, gay ex-Muslim who faced adversity for his sexuality and background. He made several TV appearances, including giving interviews for CNN's Christiane Amanpour, Amara Walker, and Don Lemon, as well as by NBC News.

Also in 2016, Sadat participated in BBC’s extended news feature on Afghanistan's LGBTQIA+ community, as well as taking part in a BBC Pashto debate on Islam and homosexuality.

Sadat took part in the National Pride March in 2017 in Washington, D.C., appearing on the cover on the Washington Blade and giving an interview for NPR.

Following the collapse of the Afghan government in August 2021 to the Taliban in the Fall of Kabul, Sadat warned of the direct threat that gay men face under Taliban rule. He appealed to the international community to speed the evacuation of vulnerable civilians and compared the Taliban to the Nazis.

Journalism
Sadat has published articles and papers in numerous publications, including the Georgetown Journal of International Affairs and Out Magazine. Prior to accepting the position at the American University of Afghanistan, he has also produced content for ABC News Nightline, CNN’s Fareed Zakaria GPS, and the UN Chronicle.

Publication
Penguin Random House India published Sadat’s first book, The Carpet Weaver, in 2019. The book is set in the 1970s and 1980’s Afghanistan and tells the story of Kanishka Nurzada, a young Afghan boy, who falls in forbidden love with his childhood male friend, Maihan, against the backdrop of Afghanistan’s golden age of paradise and the turbulent transition to civil war.

See also
 LGBT rights in Afghanistan

References

20th-century Afghan educators
21st-century Afghan educators
20th-century Afghan writers
21st-century Afghan writers
20th-century American educators
21st-century American educators
20th-century American journalists
21st-century American journalists
20th-century American male writers
21st-century American male writers
Afghan former Muslims
Afghan human rights activists
Afghan journalists
Afghan novelists
American former Muslims
American journalists of Asian descent
American male journalists
American male novelists
American people of Afghan descent
American University of Afghanistan
Fatwas
American gay writers
American LGBT journalists
Afghan LGBT people
American LGBT rights activists
Living people
Year of birth missing (living people)
California State University, Fullerton alumni
University of California, Irvine alumni
Harvard Extension School alumni
Columbia University alumni
Alumni of the University of Oxford